Víctor Ángel Pagán (born 20 February 1939) is a Puerto Rican weightlifter. He competed at the 1964 Summer Olympics, the 1968 Summer Olympics and the 1972 Summer Olympics.

References

1939 births
Living people
Puerto Rican male weightlifters
Olympic weightlifters of Puerto Rico
Weightlifters at the 1964 Summer Olympics
Weightlifters at the 1968 Summer Olympics
Weightlifters at the 1972 Summer Olympics
People from Aguadilla, Puerto Rico
Pan American Games medalists in weightlifting
Pan American Games silver medalists for Puerto Rico
Pan American Games bronze medalists for Puerto Rico
Weightlifters at the 1967 Pan American Games
Weightlifters at the 1971 Pan American Games
20th-century Puerto Rican people